Michel Ange Houasse (Paris, 1680 – Arpajon, 1730) was a French painter, most of whose career was spent at the court of Philip V of Spain, who summoned him to the court in Madrid in 1715 whilst he was still Philip of Anjou. (Michel Ange had already trained in the studio of his father, René-Antoine Houasse.) Michel Ange produced many portraits of the Spanish royal family, including ones of the future king Louis I. He introduced Spain to mythological and rural scenes he had learned from Flemish Baroque art. His taste for pastoral and bucolic genre scenes resulted in paintings such as Blind man's buff (in Spanish, La gallina ciega), clearly influenced by Watteau and itself a clear influence on Goya's oil on linen cartoon of the same name. In his later years he came into friction over works for the royal court with his fellow French artist Jean Ranc.

Sources

Scholarly articles in English about Michel-Ange Houasse both in web and PDF @ the Spanish Old Masters Gallery
Biography on artehistoria.com
Biographies and lives

1680 births
1730 deaths
17th-century French painters
French male painters
18th-century French painters
18th-century French male artists